The Rolls-Royce Corniche is a two-door, front-engine, rear wheel drive luxury car produced by Rolls-Royce Motors as a hardtop coupé (from 1971 to 1980) and as a convertible (from 1971 to 1995 and 1999 to 2002).

The Corniche was a development of the Mulliner Park Ward two-door versions of the Rolls-Royce Silver Shadow. These were designated as the 2-door Saloon and Drophead Coupé,   introduced in 1965 and 1966 respectively. Production remained in London at Mulliner Park Ward; the new name was applied in March 1971.

A Bentley version of the Corniche was also produced. It became known as the Bentley Continental from 1984 to 1995.

The Corniche draws its name from the experimental 1939 Corniche prototype. The name originally comes from the French word corniche, a coastal road, especially along the face of a cliff, most notably the Grande Corniche along the French Riviera above the principality of Monaco.

1939 experimental Corniche

The first car with the Corniche nameplate was a 1939 prototype based on the Bentley Mark V, featuring coachwork designed in collaboration with several third parties, most prominent of which acclaimed French designer Georges Paulin, built by Parisian firm Carrosserie Vanvooren.

It undertook 15,000 miles (24,000 km) of endurance testing in Continental Europe before being blown up by a bomb at a dock in Dieppe while awaiting shipment back to England.  No production model was ever manufactured because of the onset of World War II, but the company registered the name for the future. Theunique car was fully re-created by Bentley's Mulliner division to join the company's heritage fleet; construction of the recreation was completed in 2019.

Corniche I (1971-1987)

The Corniche, available as coupé or convertible, used the standard Rolls-Royce V8 engine with an aluminium-silicon alloy block and aluminium cylinder heads with cast iron wet cylinder liners. The bore was 4.1 in (104.1 mm) and the stroke was 3.9 in (99.1 mm) for a total of 6.75 L (6,750 cc/411 cuin). Twin SU carburettors were initially fitted, but were replaced with a single Solex 4A1 four-barrel carburetor introduced in 1977. De-smogged export models retained the twin SUs until 1980, when Bosch fuel injection was added.

A three-speed automatic transmission (a Turbo Hydramatic 400 sourced from General Motors) was standard. A four-wheel independent suspension with coil springs was augmented with a hydraulic self-levelling system (using the same system as did Citroën, but without pneumatic springs, and with the hydraulic components built under licence by Rolls-Royce), at first on all four, but later on the rear wheels only. Four wheel disc brakes were specified, with ventilated discs added for 1972.

The car originally used a  wheelbase.
The Corniche was different from other Silver Shadows in that it had exclusive half wheel covers with stainless steel trim (for brake cooling), a 3-spoke steering wheel with a wood rim, and Rolls Royce's first standard tachometer.

The Corniche received a mild restyling in the spring of 1977. Difference included rack-and-pinion steering, alloy and rubber bumpers, aluminium radiator, oil cooler and a bi-level air conditioning system was added. Later changes included a modified rear independent suspension in March 1979. In March 1981, after the Silver Spirit had gone on sale, the Coupé version of the Corniche and its Bentley sister were discontinued. For 1985 there were also cosmetic and interior changes.

Corniche models received Bosch KE/K-Jetronic fuel injection in 1977.

The Bentley version was updated in July 1984 with a new name, the Continental, revised and color-coded bumpers, rear view mirrors, a new dash and improvements to the seats.

Production totaled 1090 Rolls-Royce Corniche Saloons, 3239 Rolls-Royce Corniche Convertibles, 69 Bentley Corniche Saloons and 77 Bentley Corniche Convertibles.

The Corniche was popular with high income celebrities, with the possible exception of Jeremy Clarkson, who mocked James May's Corniche as "just a Ford Zephyr with a chrome nose" during a Top Gear competition between his Mercedes 600 Grosser and May's Corniche.

Corniche II (1986-1989)

The Corniche II name was applied for the United States market from 1986 and for other markets from 1988. Anti-lock brakes were added for 1988, but air bags would not be available until the Corniche III. Also new for 1988 were some detail changes to the interior. Later in 1988 there was also a new reverse warning lens type and pattern around the rear license plate, as well as newly designed seats and redesigned instrumentation.

1,234 examples of the Corniche II were produced.

Corniche III (1989-1993)

The Corniche III was introduced at the 1989 Frankfurt Motor Show with new alloy wheels, color-coded bumpers, a more advanced suspension system, air bags and MK-Motronic fuel injections. Minor interior changes included a revised dashboard, console and seats. 452 were made.

Corniche IV (1992-1995)

The car was reworked for 1992 as the Corniche IV, presented at the January North American International Auto Show in Detroit. By this time production had moved to Crewe, in preparation for the 1994 closure of Mulliner Park Ward. Mechanically, the IV featured the four-speed 4L80-E automatic transmission rather than the previous three-speed GM400 unit. Adaptive suspension was also introduced. Visually there is nearly no difference between the Corniche III and IV except for a glass rear window replacing the previous plastic unit. The top mechanism was improved, no longer requiring manual latching. CFC-free air conditioning was specified, as were driver and passenger airbags. 

In October 1992 a 21st anniversary Corniche was presented. Twenty-five cars were built, all finished in Ming Blue with a cream hood with a silver plaque on the dash.

In August 1993 engine power was increased by 20 percent.

Corniche S 

The last 25 Corniche IV models to be built, completed in the summer of 1995, were unique turbocharged versions and were called the Corniche S. They came with a dashboard plate, individually numbered (out of 25).

Corniche V (2000-2002)

The fifth series to bear the Corniche name made its debut in January 2000. At the time of its release, it was the most expensive vehicle offered by Rolls-Royce, with a base price of US$359,900. Its production was ended in August 2002, after Bentley had become a subsidiary of Volkswagen AG and took over the Crewe manufacturing site while the rights to the Rolls-Royce name and trademarks were licensed by Rolls-Royce Aero Engines to BMW, building their cars in a new factory built by BMW on the Goodwood Estate near Chichester, West Sussex.

Production
 Rolls-Royce Corniche I: 4,332
 Saloon (1971–1981): 1,108
 Convertible (1971–1988): 3,224
 Bentley Corniche: 140
 Saloon (1971–1981): 63
 Convertible (1971–1984): 77
 Rolls-Royce Corniche II (1988–1989): 1,234
 Rolls-Royce Corniche III (1989–1992): 452
 Rolls-Royce Corniche IV (1992–1995): 244
 Corniche IV (1992–1995): 219
 Corniche S (1995): 25
 Rolls-Royce Corniche V (2000–2002): 384
 Corniche V "Final Series": 45
 Bentley Continental (1984–1994): 421
 Bentley Continental Turbo (1992–1995): 8

See also
Rolls-Royce Corniche (2000)
Rolls-Royce 100EX
Rolls-Royce Phantom Drophead Coupé

References

Bibliography

External links

Corniche
Cars introduced in 1971
1980s cars
1990s cars
Coupés
Convertibles
Rear-wheel-drive vehicles